The Hodgetwins, (born September 17, 1975), also known as the Conservative Twins, are an American stand-up comedy and conservative political commentary duo consisting of twin brothers Keith and Kevin Hodge. The twins started out as YouTubers, but in 2016 branched out to live stand-up comedy shows as well.

They were at VidCon 2016, and The Root named them as the third best black creators at the event.

Biography
They enlisted in the Marine Corps and by 2013 they had over half a million subscribers on YouTube.

Their cousins' pair of children were both shot, so they used their social media presence to raise money for their medical expenses.

Both twins have been married to their current wives for over 15 years, and lived in Los Angeles for 17 years.  They currently reside in Las Vegas.

Fitness
The Hodge twins are certified International Sports Sciences Association trainers and appeared on the front page of Train magazine. They were guests on comedy podcast The Fighter and the Kid. CheatSheet rated them as the 4th best fitness YouTube channel.

Comedy
They have toured the UK, and Australia. Their No Filter tour took place in 2016.

Conservative commentators
The Hodge twins are vocal conservatives, and have over two million subscribers on their Conservative Twins YouTube channel.
The Hodge twins are Donald Trump supporters, and appeared on Trump's Real News Update webcast. The twins oppose the Black Lives Matter political and social movement.

Two of the most shared Facebook posts about the George Floyd protests originated from the Hodge twins. They are frequent guests on conservative comedian Steven Crowder's various programs.

Controversy
Claims the twins have made about Joe Biden and Black Lives Matter have been rated "false" by fact checkers. 
They have had a venue cancel one of their shows after the Hodgetwins posted a video to their YouTube account making fun of a transgender woman. The venue owner stated that the reason for the cancellation was "We don't tolerate transphobia."

See also 
 Black conservatism in the United States
 Diamond and Silk

References

External links 

 
 
 

1975 births
Living people
21st-century American comedians
American bodybuilders
American comedy duos
American stand-up comedians
American YouTubers
Black conservatism in the United States
Comedy YouTubers
Comedy-related YouTube channels
Commentary YouTubers
English-language YouTube channels
Health and fitness YouTubers
Instagram accounts
People from Martinsville, Virginia
American twins
YouTube channels launched in 2008
Comedians from Virginia
Virginia Republicans
Identical twin males
American identical twins